Furaha is a settlement in Kenya's Tana River County.

Furaha has also lent its name to a popular spirits brand, Furaha Brandy and Furaha Gin, produced by Africa Spirits Limited.

References 

Populated places in Tana River County